Phamtam is a village in the Mangan subdivision of North Sikkim district in the north Indian state of Sikkim. The Ministry of Home Affairs has given it a geographical code of 260902.

References

Cities and towns in Mangan district